In Vietnamese cuisine, Gà nướng sả is grilled chicken with lemon grass (sả). Common ingredients include garlic, onion, honey, sugar or pepper. Grilled beef and other meats are also popular variations.

See also
 List of Vietnamese dishes

References

Vietnamese chicken dishes